Boteka (also known as Flandria) is a settlement in the Province of Équateur in the Democratic Republic of the Congo. The village is served by Boteka Airport.

History 
The village is noted for its abandoned plantation of the same name.

References 

Populated places in the province of Équateur
Plantations